Bonedry may refer to:

Bonedry clay, the stage at which greenware is ready to be fired.
Bone-dry wine, dry wine with residual sugar levels of less than 0.5%, such as Santorini.